Madeline Hunter is an American author of romance novels. She lives in Pennsylvania.

Biography
Madeline Hunter's first book By Arrangement was published in 2000 and she received the award for Waldenbooks Bestselling Debut Author that year.

In 2000 she also received a rare starred review from Publishers Weekly for her book By Possession. This happened again in 2003 with The Charmer.

She has been nominated four times and has twice won the Romance Writers of America's prestigious RITA award, first in the long historical category for Stealing Heaven in 2003 and then in the historical category for Lessons of Desire in 2008. Fifteen of her books have appeared on the USA Today bestseller list. She has also appeared on the New York Times Bestseller List  and the Waldenbooks Paperback Fiction Bestseller List. Romantic Times has awarded four and a half star reviews to fifteen of her books.

Madeline Hunter speaks at writers' conferences and events on craft and industry, is a Ph.D. in Art History. She currently lives in Pennsylvania.

Recognition
2000 - Received Romance Writers of America RITA Award for Best Long Historical Romance, for Stealing Heaven
2008 - Received Romance Writers of America RITA Award for Best Historical Romance, for Lessons of Desire

Bibliography

Medieval Historicals
 By Arrangement
 By Possession
 By Design
 The Protector
 Lord of a Thousand Nights
 Stealing Heaven

The Seducer Series
 The Seducer
 The Saint
 The Charmer
 The Sinner
 The Romantic

The Seducer Spin-offs
 Lord of Sin
 Lady of Sin

The Rothwell Series
 Rules of Seduction
 Lessons of Desire
 Secrets of Surrender
 The Sins of Lord Easterbrook

The Rarest Bloom Series
 Ravishing in Red
 Provocative in Pearls
 Sinful in Satin
 Dangerous in Diamonds

The Fairbourne Quartet
 The Surrender of Miss Fairbourne
 The Conquest of Lady Cassandra 
 The Counterfeit Mistress
 The Accidental Duchess

The Wicked Trilogy
 His Wicked Reputation
 Tall, Dark e Wicked
 The Wicked Duke

Other
 "An Interrupted Tapestry" in Tapestry (anthology with Lynn Kurland, Karen Marie Moning and Sherrilyn Kenyon)

References

External links 
 Official Madeline Hunter Website
 Penguin Books USA
Author Spotlight and Author Bookshelf (Official publisher web page)

Living people
American romantic fiction writers
RITA Award winners
Writers from Pennsylvania
Year of birth missing (living people)